The discography of David Arkenstone consists of nearly 80 studio albums, six collaboration albums, seven compilation albums, one live album, and seventeen soundtracks/video game scores. The Arkenstone collaboration albums include five albums with his trio, Troika and one album with Nicholas Gunn as Briza Additionally, he has composed a number of songs for the video game World of Warcraft.

Albums

Studio albums

Troika Series  
(composed by David Arkenstone;  performed, produced and recorded by Troika)

Briza 
(composed by David Arkenstone and Nicholas Gunn)

Live albums

Compilation albums

Compilation Appearances

Soundtracks

See also
Benise

References 

Discographies of American artists